Sosnove is an urban-type settlement in Rivne Raion of Rivne Oblast, Ukraine, located in the historic region of Volhynia. Population: 

The Sluch River flows through the town.

History

The town of Ludwipol was founded in 1708 after the town of Hubków, which lies 4 km to the east of current day Sosnove, was destroyed during the Swedish invasion of Poland during the Great Northern War.

Before 1918 Ludwipol was a settlement in Volhynian Governorate of the Russian Empire.

Between World War I and World War II Ludwipol was a capital of the Ludwipol gmina in Kostopol County, Wołyń Voivodship of Poland, and its population was mostly Jewish. The Gmina Ludwipol consisted of villages, colonies, and hutors in most cases no longer in existence; not even traces of their names remain.

There is a memorial for the mass grave of Ludvipol Jewish families killed by the Nazis in 1942.  The memorial is located in the forest across the Sluch, a short way from town.

The Wójt for the gmina during this inter-war period was Marian Chołodecki.  Sometime during 1944 the entire town of Ludwipol was burned to the ground in retaliation for the killing of some German soldiers by area partisans. The eradication of the Gmina Ludwipol was a result of both the ethnic cleansing by Ukrainian nationalists in World War II especially in 1943, as well as the population transfer conducted by the Soviets in 1945. The remaining inhabitants were moved to the Recovered Territories of Poland.

In its place a new settlement called Sosnove was built.

In January 1989 the population was 2,213.

In January 2013 the population was 2,033.

Other names and spelling variations
 Sosnovoje (Ukrainian)
 Selisht, Selishche (Yiddish)
 Seish Scihin (Yiddish)
 Siedlisczce, Siedliszcze (Russian)
 Sagol Slistht (German)
 Ludwipol, Ludvipol, Lyudvipol (Ukrainian)
 Ludwipol (Polish)
 Lyudvilpol (Hungarian)
 Lyudvopol (Czech)

References

 Aharon Golub Kaddishel: A Life Reborn  Unlike Concentration Camp accounts, the author relates the story of a young boy growing up in Ludwipol, a small Jewish, Polish and Ukrainian village. He was an eye-witness to the ghettoization, eventual mass murder of the Jewish population in 1942 by the Nazis and their collaborators.

External links
Strony o Wołyniu
Gmina Ludwipol
Bronisławka

Urban-type settlements in Rivne Raion
Volhynian Governorate
Wołyń Voivodeship (1921–1939)
Populated places established in 1708
Shtetls
1708 establishments in Europe
Nazi war crimes in Ukraine
Mass murder in 1942